The maroon-backed whistler (Coracornis raveni) is a species of bird in the family Pachycephalidae. It is endemic to Sulawesi, Indonesia. Its natural habitat is subtropical or tropical moist montane forests. Some authorities have classified the maroon-backed whistler in the genus Pachycephala. Alternate names include the Rano Rano whistler and Raven's whistler.

References

maroon-backed whistler
Endemic birds of Sulawesi
maroon-backed whistler
maroon-backed whistler
Taxonomy articles created by Polbot